Arthrobacter pityocampae is a Gram-positive, non-spore-forming and non-motile bacterium species from the genus Arthrobacter which has been isolated from the larva of the moth Thaumetopoea pityocampa in Samsun, Turkey.

References

Further reading

External links
Type strain of Arthrobacter pityocampae at BacDive -  the Bacterial Diversity Metadatabase

Bacteria described in 2014
Micrococcaceae